Abrotanella spathulata is a member of the daisy family and is endemic species of the Antipodean Islands.

References

spathulata
Taxa named by Joseph Dalton Hooker